is a railway station on the Kōnan Railway Kōnan Line in the city of Kuroishi, Aomori, Japan, operated by the private railway operator Konan Railway.

Lines

Station layout
The station has one side platform serving a single bidirectional line. It is unattended, and has no station building other than a small shelter on the platform.

Adjacent stations

History
Sakaimatsu Station was opened on July 1, 1950. The station was operated as a (kan'i itaku station from October 1950 to December 1953 by the station master's family, and has been unattended since December 1953. A new station building was completed in July 1997.

Surrounding area
The station is located in a rural area surrounded by farms, with only a few houses nearby.

See also
 List of railway stations in Japan

External links

 

Railway stations in Aomori Prefecture
Konan Railway
Railway stations in Japan opened in 1950
Kuroishi, Aomori